Crassicorophium is a genus of amphipod crustaceans, comprising three species:

Crassicorophium bonellii (Milne Edwards, 1830)
Crassicorophium clarencense (Shoemaker, 1949)
Crassicorophium crassicorne (Bruzelius, 1859)

References

Corophiidea